Egyptian nationalism is based on Egyptians and Egyptian culture. Egyptian nationalism has typically been a civic nationalism that has emphasized the unity of Egyptians regardless of their ethnicity or religion. Egyptian nationalism first manifested itself as Anti-English sentiment during the Egyptian revolution of 1919.

History

Late 19th century
Both the Arabic language and the ancient Egyptian language are Afroasiatic languages. The rule of Muhammad Ali of Egypt led Egypt to a more advanced level of industrialization in comparison with Egypt's neighbors, along with more discoveries of relics of ancient Egyptian civilization. The Urabi movement in the 1870s and 1880s was the first major Egyptian nationalist movement that demanded an end to the alleged despotism of the Muhammad Ali family and demanded curbing the growth of European influence in Egypt, it campaigned under the nationalist slogan of "Egypt for Egyptians".

One of the key figures in opposing British rule was the Egyptian journalist Yaqub Sanu whose cartoons from 1870s onward satirizing first the Khedive, Ismail the Magnificent, and then Egypt's British rulers as bumbling buffoons were very popular in the 19th century. Sanu was the first to write in Egyptian Arabic, which was intended to appeal to a mass audience, and his cartoons could be easily understood by even the illiterate.  Sanu had established the newspaper Abu-Naddara Zarqa, which was the first newspaper to use Egyptian Arabic in March 1877. One of his cartoons mocked Ismail the Magnificent for his fiscal extravagance which caused Egypt's bankruptcy in 1876, leading Ismail, who did not appreciate the cartoon, to order his arrest. Sanu fled to Paris, and continued to publish Abu-Naddara Zarqa there, with its issues being smuggled into Egypt until his death in 1912.

The period between 1860 − 1940 was characterized by El-nahda, renaissance or rebirth. It is best known its renewed interest in Egyptian antiquity and the cultural achievements that were inspired by it. Along with this interest came an indigenous, Egypt-centered orientation, particularly among the Egyptian intelligentsia that would affect Egypt's autonomous development as a sovereign and independent nation-state. The first Egyptian renaissance intellectual was Rifa'a el-Tahtawi. In 1831, Tahtawi undertook a career in journalism, education and translation. Three of his published volumes were works of political and moral philosophy. In them he introduces his students to Enlightenment ideas such as secular authority and political rights and liberty; his ideas regarding how a modern civilized society ought to be and what constituted by extension a civilized or "good Egyptian"; and his ideas on public interest and the public good.

Tahtawi was instrumental in sparking indigenous interest in Egypt's ancient heritage. He composed several poems in praise of Egypt and wrote two other general histories of the country. He also co-founded with his contemporary Ali Mubarak, the architect of the modern Egyptian school system.

20th century
After the British occupation of Egypt began in 1882, Egyptian nationalism became focused upon ending the occupation.  They had support from Liberals and Socialists in Britain. Wilfrid Scawen Blunt, an anti-imperialist, criticized the British occupation in three widely circulated books:  The Secret History of the English Occupation of Egypt... (1907), Gordon at Khartoum (1911), and My Diaries: Being a Personal Narrative of Events, 1888-1914 (2 vols. 1919–20). Historian Robert O. Collins says:
 The most vigorous English advocate of Egyptian Independence, Blunt was both arrogant and irascible, his works scathing, discursive, and at times utterly ridiculous. Immature and unfair, both he and his writings must be used with caution, but even the dullest of men will come away stimulated if not aroused and with fresh insights to challenge the sometimes smug attitudes of British officials in Whitehall and Cairo. Of course, to them Blunt was anathema if not disloyal and Edward Malet, the British Consul-General at Cairo from 1879 to 1883, replied to Blunt's charges in his posthumously published Egypt, 1879-1883. 

Mustafa Kamil Pasha, A leading Egyptian nationalist of the early 20th century, was greatly influenced by the example of Meiji Japan as an 'Eastern' state that had successfully modernized for Egypt and from the time of the Russian-Japanese war consistently urged in his writings that Egypt emulate Japan. Kamil was also a Francophile like most educated Egyptians of his generation, and the French republican values of liberté, égalité, fraternité influenced his understanding of what it meant to be Egyptian as Kamil defined the Egyptian Identity in terms of loyalty to Egypt. Kamil together with other Egyptian nationalists helped to redefine loyalty to al-watan ("the homeland") in terms stressing the importance of education, nizam (order), and love of al-watan, implicitly criticizing the state created by Mohammad Ali the Great, which was run on very militarist lines.  After the Entente Cordial of 1904 ended hopes of French support for Egyptian independence, a disillusioned Kamil looked east towards Japan as a model, defining Egypt as an "Eastern" country occupied by "Western" Great Britain, and suggested in terms that anticipated later Third World nationalism that Egyptians had more in common with people from other places controlled by Western nations such as  British India (modern-day India, Pakistan, and Bangladesh) and the Dutch East Indies (modern-day Indonesia) than they did with the nations of Europe.

Egyptian nationalism reached its peak in popularity in 1919 when revolution against British rule took place in response to wartime policies imposed by the British authorities in Egypt during World War I. Three years of protest and political turmoil followed until Britain unilaterally declared the independence of Egypt in 1922 that was a monarchy, though Britain reserved several areas for British supervision. During the period of the Kingdom of Egypt, Egyptian nationalists remained determined to terminate the remaining British presence in Egypt. One of the more noteworthy cases of Egyptian nationalism occurred in December 1922 when the Egyptian government laid claim to the artifacts found in the tomb of King Tutankhamun, which had been discovered by a British archaeologist named Howard Carter in November 1922, arguing that they belonged to Egypt and Carter could not take them to Britain as he planned. The dispute finally led to the Egyptians posting an armed guard outside of Tutankhamun's tomb to prevent Carter from entering it. In February 1924, the Egyptian government seized control of the tomb and with it all of the artifacts found there, saying that they belonged to Egypt. On 6 March 1924, the Prime Minister Saad Zaghloul formally opened to Tutankamun's tomb to the Egyptian public in an elaborate ceremony held at night with the sky lit up by floodlights, which reportedly attracted the largest crowd seen in Luxor. The reopening turned into an anti-British demonstration when the British High Commissioner, Field Marshal Allenby, arrived when the crowd was demanding immediate British withdrawal from Egypt. The dispute over who owned King Tutankhamun's treasures took place against the backdrop of a movement in the Egyptian liberal elite  known as Pharaonism which extolled ancient Egypt as a national symbol and portrayed Egypt as a Mediterranean nation.

The nationalistic Young Egypt in the 1930s led by Ahmed Hussein advocated British withdrawal from Egypt and the Sudan, and promised to unite the Arab world under the leadership of Egypt, through the Young Egyptian Society made it clear in the proposed empire, it was Egypt that would dominate, as it was later seen with the brief unification with Syria in 1958.  At the same time, It was condemned by Hassan al-Banna, the founder and Supreme Guide of the  Muslim Brotherhood, as glorifying a period of jahiliyyah. In a 1937 article, Banna dismissed "Pharaohism" for glorying the "pagan reactionary Pharaohs" like Akhenaten, Ramesses II the Great and Tutankhamun instead of Muhammad and his companions and for seeking to "annihilate" Egypt's Muslim identity.

In January 1952, British forces surrounded an Egyptian police station and demanded they surrender a group of fedayeen guerillas who had taken shelter there and leave the canal zone. After the Egyptians shot and killed a British negotiator, the British commander present ordered an attack on the police station; 50 policemen were killed in the ensuing firefight, and the rest were captured. The capital of Egypt, Cairo, overflowed with anti-British violence in a riot on 26 January 1952 known as the "Black Saturday" riot. The Black Saturday riots led to the development of the Free Officer movement, consisting of a thousand "middle-level" officers, overthrowing King Farouk. After the Egyptian Revolution of 1952 that overthrew the monarchy and established a republic, Gamal Abdel Nasser rose to power on themes that was based on Arab nationalism. Nasser saw Egypt as the leader of the Arab states and saw Egypt's role as promoting Arab solidarity against both the West and Israel.

In 1952 Nasser produced a half programmatic entitled The Philosophy of the Revolution. It offers and account to how he and other officers who overthrew the monarchy on July 23 of that year came to a decision to seize power and how they planned to use their newly won power. Under Nasser, Egypt's Arab identity was greatly played up, and Nasser promoted a policy of pan-Arabism, arguing that all of the Arab peoples should be united together in a single state under his leadership. Egypt was briefly united with Syria under the name the United Arab Republic from 1958 until 1961 when Syria abandoned the union. Nasser saw himself as the successor of Mohammad Ali Pasha, who had sought to found a new dynasty to rule the Ottoman Empire in the 19th century. Nasser came to embrace pan-Arabism as the best way to Liberate Egypt and the Arab world from imperialistic control and to achieve great power status as Nasser viewed the Arab world as so interwined that it is effectively "One Nation divided by colonial powers".

Nasser's successors, Anwar Sadat and Hosni Mubarak continued to emphasize Arab nationalism and identity but based on Egypt's distinctiveness within the Arab world as Sadat changed Egypt official name from "United Arab Republic" to "The Arab republic of Egypt". Sadat upon taking office in 1970 announced that his first policy would be "Egypt first".  In December 1970, Sadat announced in a speech that Egypt would be willing to make peace with Israel provided the latter returned the Sinai peninsula, making no mention of the West Bank, Gaza Strip or the Golan Heights. Sadat in a speech said Let there be no more war or bloodshed between Arabs and Israelis. Let there be no more suffering or denial of rights. Let there be no more despair or loss of faith.

After the 1973 October War had boosted his image and the Egyptian army's image in Egypt, Sadat began a wholesale attack on Nasser's legacy, including his Pan-Arabist policies, which were portrayed as having dragged Egypt into poverty, a long grinding war in Yemen, and subservience to the Soviet Union. In contrast to the secularist Nasser, Sadat began a policy of playing up Egypt's Muslim identity, having the constitution amended in 1971 to say that Sharia law was "a main source of all state legislation" and in 1980 to say that Sharia law was the main source of all legislation which ended up as very controversial in Egypt and many opposed it, although over time Egypt would become more conservative following the discovery of oil in Gulf states which led to Egyptians going there for work and returning with an extremally conservative ideology "Wahhabism". Through Sadat was not an Islamic fundamentalist, under his rule Islam started to be portrayed as the cornerstone of Egyptian national identity. Sadat had chosen to launch what Egyptians call the Ramadan/October War in 1973 during the holy month of Ramadan and the code-name for the initial assault on the Israeli Bar Lev Line on the Suez Canal was Operation Badr, after  Muhammad's first victory, both gestures that would have been unthinkable under Nasser as Sadat chose to appeal to Islamic feelings. Sadat and Mubarak also abandoned Nasser's  conflict with Israel and the West.  Sadat chose to engage in Islamism as he released Islamists from prisons to combat Nasserist and Communist influence .

See also
Ahmed Lutfi el-Sayed
Arab nationalism
Egyptian Revolution of 1919
Egyptian Revolution of 1952
Gamal Abdel Nasser
Saad Zaghloul
Taha Hussein
Pharaonism

References

Bibliography

 

Lin Noueihed, Alex Warren. The Battle for the Arab Spring: Revolution, Counter-Revolution and the Making of a New Era. Yale University Press, 2012.